Rui Gonçalo Adão Manique Caniço (born 18 October 1995 in Salvaterra de Magos) is a Portuguese footballer who plays for O Coruchense as a forward.

Football career
On 25 January 2014, Caniço made his professional debut with Estoril Praia in a 2013–14 Taça da Liga match against Beira-Mar.

References

External links

Stats and profile at LPFP 

1995 births
Living people
Portuguese footballers
Association football forwards
G.D. Estoril Praia players
People from Santarém, Portugal
Sportspeople from Santarém District